Glenea pseudocaninia is a species of beetle in the family Cerambycidae. It was described by Lin and Montreuil in 2009.

References

pseudocaninia
Beetles described in 2009